The Khoirabari massacre was an ethnic massacre of an estimated 100 to 500 immigrant Bengalis in the Khoirabari area of Assam, India, on 7 February 1983. Activists of the Assam Agitation sought to block an assembly election that day and had cut communications to the Bengali enclaves, which were perceived to be pro-election. Indigenous Assamese groups, who had held resentments toward the immigrant Bengalis, took advantage of the resulting isolation and surrounded and attacked the Bengali villages at night.

News surrounding the massacre was not reported for two weeks. Journalist Shekhar Gupta reported a top Assam police officer admitting that the Assam police were preoccupied with the exaggerated news of the massacre of the Assamese people in Gohpur, and that they failed to take proper action in Khoirabari on time.

Background 
Prior to the Partition of India, the Khoirabari area was inhabited by Bengali-speaking Muslims of eastern Bengal origin ie Bangladesh. Following the Partition, the Bengali-speaking Muslims left for East Pakistan and the Bengali Hindu refugees from East Pakistan settled on the abandoned lands vacated by the Muslims. The Bengali Hindu refugee settlers, however, were not given pattas (a document certifying the ownership of the land). In 1983, there was an enclave of hundreds of immigrant Bengali Hindus refugees living in a cluster of villages in the Khoirabari area, surrounded by Indigenous Assamese villages. For years there had been resentment between them and the native Assamese.

Massacre 
The first phase of polling of assembly election was scheduled for 14 February 1983. The activists of the Assam Agitation were opposed to the elections and viewed the non-Assamese immigrant pockets as pro-election. The communication links to the non-Assamese immigrant pockets were cut. As a result, the Central Reserve Police Force and the polling agents could not be sent to Khoirabari. Taking advantage of the situation, native Assamese mobs surrounded and attacked the isolated immigrant Bengali Hindu refugee villages at night. According to veteran Assamese journalist Sabita Goswami, the immigrant Bengali Hindus had taken shelter at the Khoirabari School, where the indigenous Assamese mob attacked them. According to Indian Police Service officer E.M. Rammohun, more than one hundred immigrant Bengali Hindus refugees were killed in the massacre. According to journalist Shekhar Gupta, more than 500 immigrant Bengali Hindus were killed. The survivors took shelter in the Khoirabari railway station until the elections were over. After the elections, Prime Minister Indira Gandhi and Assam Chief Minister Hiteshwar Saikia visited the Khoirabari relief camp. Ramakrishna Mission did relief work among the survivors at the camp.

Aftermath 
Following the massacre, K. S. Sudarshan and other leaders of Hindu nationalist group Rashtriya Swayamsevak Sangh (RSS) approached Gupta to understand why so many immigrant Bengali Hindus were massacred by the indigenous Assamese communities. The RSS leadership considered the Bengali Hindus "unprotected" and did not expect the native Assamese to kill their coreligionists. Gupta explained the ethnic and linguistic fault lines that lay behind the massacre, which were so deep that the perpetrators did not distinguish between Hindus and Muslims. This was actually a cause of indigenous and native sentiment of the original inhabitants the Assamese for their survival under the threat of Bengali-speaking immigrants whether it be Hindu or Muslim.

In February 2018, the Compensation-demand Committee of Dead People in the Assam Movement took up the cause of the immigrant Bengali Hindu victims of the massacres in Khoirabari and Goreswar in 1983. It demanded martyr status for the victims and compensation for the families. Rangiya legislator Bhabesh Kalita acknowledged the massacre and assured that the victims' families would get compensation.

See also 
 Silapathar massacre
 North Kamrup massacre

References 

Massacres of Bengali Hindus in India
1983 murders in India
Massacres in 1983
1980s in Assam
February 1983 events in Asia
Massacres in India
Ethnic cleansing in Asia
Violence against Hindus in India
Massacres of Bengali Hindus in Assam
Massacres of Bengalis in Assam